, also known as KTS, is a television network headquartered in Kagoshima, Kagoshima Prefecture, Japan.  It is affiliated with Fuji News Network (FNN) and Fuji Network System (FNS). 

Kagoshima Television is the second commercial television station in Kagoshima prefecture,  started broadcast in 1969.  KTS was a triple affiliate of FNN, NNN and ANN when it begins broadcasting. On December 1, 2006, KTS started digital terrestrial television broadcasting.

References

External links
 Official website 

Fuji News Network
Companies based in Kagoshima Prefecture
Television stations in Japan
Television channels and stations established in 1968
1968 establishments in Japan